Bang Pakong (Thai: บางปะกง) may refer to:
Bang Pakong River
Bang Pakong District, Chachoengsao Province
Bang Pakong, Bang Pakong District, Chachoengsao Province
, a Thai ship